Brețcu is a commune in Covasna County, Transylvania, Romania composed of three villages:

Brețcu / Bereck
Mărtănuș / Kézdimartonos
Oituz / Ojtoztelep

The village has been recorded under different names: Bereczk (1476), Breczko (1482-1496), Bretzku (1787 and 1850) and Bereck (1854).

The Roman castra and settlement of Angustia and is located on the east side of the village. G. Popa Lisseanu argued that Brețcu was an old Romanian land mentioned in 1426 by King Sigismund in an official document. In that document, King Sigismund offered privileges to Romanians and to their Duke (the names of some Romanians were cited: Ioan and Radul, Țacu's son). The document contains the first attestation of Brețcu village.

Demographics
According to the 2011 census, the commune  has a population of 3,510 of which 71.46% are Hungarians and 22.9% are Romanians.

Personalities
Áron Gábor, hero of the Hungarian Revolution of 1848 was born here in 1814.

References

External links
 Information in English, Hungarian, Romanian

Communes in Covasna County
Localities in Transylvania